Ambon is a commune in the Morbihan department in the  Brittany region in northwestern France.

Population
Inhabitants of Ambon are called Ambonnais.

See also
Communes of the Morbihan department

References

External links
Official site 

Mayors of Morbihan Association 

Communes of Morbihan